Tiruchirapalli Central Prison is located in Tiruchirapalli, India. The prison was built during 1865. The prison complex occupies an area comprising . It is authorised to accommodate 2517 prisoners.

Notable prisoners 

 Subhash Kapoor

References

External links 
Tamil Nadu Prison Department

Prisons in Tamil Nadu
Buildings and structures in Tiruchirappalli
1865 establishments in India